Carlo Lucarelli (born 26 October  1960) is an Italian crime-writer, TV presenter, and magazine editor. He was shortlisted for the Gold Dagger in 2003 for the novel Almost Blue.

Early life
Lucarelli was born at Parma, the son of a physician. He was interested in literature and theatre when he was young, and studied Literature and History.  

Already in his years of study, during his research for his thesis subject he got in touch with the material for his first two books, which take place during the time of fascism and the years immediately after the war.

Career
In Italy he became well-known quite soon because of these two books, and it was only a matter of time before he quit his academic activities and turned to his career as an author and all other sorts of literary activities, such as writing plays, film scenarios, radio-plays and, moreover, singing in a Post-Punk-Band called "Progetto K".

For a time he was the presenter of a popular Italian television programme about crime (Blu notte misteri d'Italia, Blue Night Mysteries of Italy). As a journalist he has worked for several newspapers and magazines, such as il manifesto, Il Messaggero and L'Europeo. He has written more than twenty novels and numerous short stories. Together with Marcello Fois and Loriano Macchiavelli he founded "Gruppo 13", a collective of crime-writers in the region of Emilia-Romagna.

Lucarelli co-wrote the scripts of Detective De Luca. A crime fiction TV series released in 2008, it was adapted from his trilogy of novels set in the time of Italy's fascist history during the years from 1938 to 1948.

Bibliography
Incomplete, English translations only. For full bibliography see the Italian Wikipedia page.

The De Luca Trilogy

 Carte Blanche (Carta bianca, 1990)
 The Damned Season (L'estate torbida, 1991)
 Via Delle Oche (1996)

The Inspector Grazia Negro Series

 Almost Blue (1997)
 Day After Day (Un giorno dopo l'altro, 2000)

References

External links

1960 births
Living people
Writers from Parma

Italian crime fiction writers
Italian male writers
Italian television personalities
Italian journalists
Italian male journalists